The White-Green is the name, based on the colour code, for uniforms of both students and teachers of public schools in Myanmar. The uniform rule, mandated in 1966, is mandatory for both students and teachers in Myanmar's public schools. The non-State or private schools can have their own uniforms and be excluded from the mandate.

History

Before 1966, each school in Burma had its own uniform.

The "White-Green" is originally the uniform of Myoma Co-educational National High School Rangoon — white yinbon eingyi and green htamein for girls; white eingyi (dress shirt), Pinni taikpon eingyi and green pahso for boys.

In 1965 and 1966, all the non-State (private, missionary, national, vernacular, special, etc.) schools were nationalized and became State Schools. On 14 February 1966, the Revolutionary Government Educational Department promulgated a mandate for all the students and teachers in the whole of Burma to wear the same uniforms.

Public school uniforms (White-Green)

Variations

White dress shirt
The white dress shirt of White-Green uniforms has 4 variations.

Collar
• with English collar
• with mandarin collar

Sleeves
• with short sleeves
• with long sleeves

White Burmese blouse
The white Burmese blouse in White-Green uniforms has 6 variations.

Opening
• buttoned at the front
• buttoned at the side

Sleeves
• with short sleeves
• with three-quarter sleeves
• with long sleeves

Green colour
Under the term "Green", these are the common variations of green used in school uniforms:

Primary school girls' uniform design

The uniform for primary school girls have many variant designs and styles.

Taikpon
These are common colour variations for taikpon used in schools:
• white 
• Pinni() //
• latte

Burmese sandals
The Burmese sandals or literally "clip footwears" are the most popular 
footwears to combine with traditional White-Green uniforms. They also have variations:

Type
• lacquer Burmese sandals
• velvet Burmese sandals

Colour
Lacquered ones are usually either black or brown.
Velvet ones vary substantially in colours.

Embroidered patches and pin badges

Embroidered patches
Almost all public schools (except TTC Yangon) require that the school's name and badge be embroidered or sewn into the uniform either on both of the arm sleeves or on the left side of the chest (above the pocket for the shirts). Usually, the names of grade or standard and the class or section are also embroidered or sewn into the uniform on the left side of the chest.
(The embroidered patches are only on the uniforms of students, not for teachers.)

Pin Badges

Notably, the Practising High School Kamayut (TTC) don't use the embroidered patches, its students wear pin badge.

In all public schools, teachers wear pin badge of the school's badge together with the school's name. Often, they also wear pin of appointment.

Uniforms of public universities and colleges

In Higher Education sector, not all universities require uniform. The uniform rules vary according to each universities or colleges, most don't even have them.

In universities, institutes and colleges that require uniforms

Universities of Education (UOEs), Education Colleges (ECs), Education Degree Colleges (EDCs), and University for Development of National Races (UDNR) adopted the traditional White-Green uniforms as uniform of their students, as their students are pre-service trainees to become school teachers.

Universities of Nursing (UONs) uses the White-Red uniform of Nursing in Myanmar as the uniform of their students, who will become nurses.

The students' uniforms of Technological Universities (TUs) are white shirt and blue-black pahso for boys, and white blouse and blue-black htamein for girls. The General Technological Institutes (GTIs) used the same uniforms before changing in 2016, after which their uniform became white shirt and black-blue trousers for both genders.

The uniforms for students of the Universities of Computer Studies (UCSs) are white shirt and blue pahso for boys, white Burmese blouse and blue htamein for girls.

The uniforms of Myanmar Aerospace Engineering University (MAEU) are white shirt with sky blue necktie and stylepant for boys, white shirt and khaki skirt for girls.

The uniforms of Myanmar Maritime University (MMU) and Myanmar Mercantile Marine College (MMMC) are the uniforms of Myanmar seafarers plus a necktie, as their students will become seafarers.

In universities and colleges that do not require uniform

In 2004, a dress code was imposed for university and college students, to wear white shirt / blouse and longyi (pahso / htamein), and not to wear T-shirt and jeans as they're banned.
But this dress code has been lossened later.

Uniforms of private schools, universities and colleges

The socialist Revolutionary Government, in 1965 and 1966, nationalized the private schools that once had their own uniforms. Then, it made the White-Green as the uniform of all the schools starting in 1966.

The Ministry of Education of the SPDC Government allowed to open private schools starting in 2010. The new private schools can use either the White-Green uniform or any uniform of their own style.

References

School uniforms
School uniforms
School uniforms
School uniform